Maps is the plural of map, a visual representation of an area. 

Maps or MAPS may also refer to:

Abbreviations 
 Madras Atomic Power Station
 Mail Abuse Prevention System, an organisation that provides anti-spam support
 Meteoritics and Planetary Science, a scientific journal
 Metropolitan Area Projects Plan, a series of capital improvement programs in Oklahoma City, Oklahoma
 Military Academy Preparatory School, another name for the United States Military Academy Preparatory School 
 Military Aircraft Preservation Society, USA
 Monitoring Avian Populations and Survivorship program, an initiative by The Institute for Bird Populations
 Moomba Adelaide Pipeline System, a network of gas pipelines in South Australia
 Multidisciplinary Association for Psychedelic Studies,  non-profit organization that researches the use of psychedelics in therapy

Cartography
 Apple Maps, web mapping service provided by Apple for use on their smartphones, tablets and computers
 Bing Maps, web mapping service provided by Microsoft
 Windows Maps, web mapping client software
 Google Maps, web mapping service provided by Google
 Google Maps (app), smartphone and tablet app version of Google's web mapping service
 Yahoo! Maps, web mapping service provided by Yahoo!
 Qwant Maps, web mapping service provided by Qwant

Music
 Maps (musician), English musician
 Maps (Get Cape. Wear Cape. Fly album), 2012
 Maps (Mixtapes album) or the title song, 2010
 Maps (EP), by Three Mile Pilot, 2012
 "Maps" (Lesley Roy song), 2021
 "Maps" (Maroon 5 song), 2014
 "Maps" (Yeah Yeah Yeahs song), 2003
 "Maps", a song by Emancipator, 2006
 "Maps", a song by Falling Up from Captiva, 2007
 "Maps", a song by the Front Bottoms from The Front Albums, 2011
 "Maps", a song by STRFKR from Being No One, Going Nowhere, 2016
 "Maps", a song written by  Lisa Kron and Jeanine Tesori, from the musical Fun Home, 2013

Other uses
 Maps (manga)
 Maps Maponyane, South African media personality

See also
 Map (disambiguation)